Charles Barber may refer to:

 Charles Alfred Barber (1860–1933), British botanist
 Charles Arnold Barber (1848–1915), Canadian architect and inventor
 Charles Barber (artist) ( 1784–1854), English landscape painter and art teacher
 Charles Barber (author) (born 1962), author writing on mental health, psychiatry
 Charles Barber (brigadier) (1888–1965), Australian soldier 1914–1948
 Charles Burton Barber (1845–1894), English painter of animals and children
 Charles Chapman Barber (died 1882), English barrister
 Charles E. Barber (1840–1917), Chief Engraver of the United States Mint
 Charles I. Barber (1887–1962), American architect
 Charles Frederick Barber (born 1949), Canadian former politician
 Charles R. Barber (1901–1987), American politician
 Charlie Barber (1854–1910), American baseball player
 Charles Williams Barber (1872–1943), U.S. Army general